Matthieu Messagier (19 July 1949 – 1 June 2021) was a French poet.

Biography
Matthieu was the son of painter and abstract artist within the School of Paris Jean Messagier, and ceramic artist Marcelle Baumann-Messagier. He lived in the Latin Quarter of Paris and Franche-Comté from 1954 to 1967. In 1969, he published an anthology on his childhood, titled Œuvres 1954-1969.

He participated in the events of May 68 and published Les Laines penchées in 1975. He became heavily active in the 1970s and continued into the 1980s. In 2003, the film , based on Messagier's works, was released.

Matthieu Messagier died in Trévenans on 1 June 2021, at the age of 71.

References

1949 births
2021 deaths
French poets
People from Doubs